Ernest Muçi (born 19 March 2001) is an Albanian professional footballer who plays as a forward for Ekstraklasa club Legia Warsaw and the Albania national team.

Early career
Muçi was born in Albania's capital Tirana and started his footballing career at local club Dinamo Tirana at the age of 15, before moving over to city rivals and the team he supported growing up, KF Tirana. He initially joined the club's under-17s. He made his professional debut for Tirana as a 16-year-old on 28 January 2018 in a 3–0 win in the Kategoria e Parë against Shkumbini, coming on as a 56th-minute substitute for Bedri Greca. He scored his first senior goal on 3 March 2018 in a 4–1 win against Shënkolli, coming on as a 62nd-minute substitute for Alked Çelhaka and scoring in the 78th minute to make it 4–0 for Tirana. He scored again later that same month, shortly after his 17th birthday against Apolonia, where he scored two goals in a 5-1 home win. He played 11 games, 6 of which were from the start, and scored 3 goals as Tirana won the 2017–18 Kategoria e Parë and achieved promotion back to Kategoria Superiore.

Kategoria Superiore
Muçi made his top-flight debut on 2 September 2018 in a 3–1 away loss to Kukësi, where he also scored in the 61st minute after coming on at half time for Yunus Sentamu. He struggled for game time in the first-team and only managed 8 league appearances and one goal as Tirana avoided relegation by 5 points. As he struggled for first-team minutes, he was a regular in the under-19s, where he scored 4 goals in 11 games to help Tirana finish 3rd in Group A of the under-19s league.

Legia Warszawa 
On 23 February 2021, Muçi signed with Polish club Legia Warsaw.

International career
Muçi begun his international career in September 2018 when Albania under-19 side manager Erjon Bogdani gave him a call-up for the friendlies versus Iceland. He earned his first cap on 8 September and scored the match's only goal to give his side a 1–0 win in Lushnjë.

On the 4 September 2020 he was called in the Albania U21 team where he scored a brace against Austria U21.

He made his debut for Albania national football team on 15 November 2021 in a World Cup qualifier against Andorra.

Honours
Tirana
 Kategoria Superiore: 2019–20
 Kategoria e Parë: 2017–18

Legia Warsaw
Ekstraklasa: 2020–21

References

2001 births
Living people
Footballers from Tirana
Albanian footballers
Association football forwards
Albania youth international footballers
Albania under-21 international footballers
Albania international footballers
KF Tirana players
Kategoria Superiore players
Ekstraklasa players
Expatriate footballers in Poland
Legia Warsaw players